Pom or POM may refer to:

Arts and entertainment
 Pom (comics) (1919–2014), a Belgian comic strip writer and artist
 Baby Pom, a fictional character in the British television programme Fimbles
 Pom, a character in the video game Them's Fightin' Herds

Organizations
 Pepco Holdings (stock symbol)
 POM Wonderful, a company and brand of pomegranate juice
 Jacksons International Airport or Port Moresby Airport (IATA code)
 Presidio of Monterey, California, a US Army installation
 Working People's Party (Moldova), a political party in Moldova

Science and technology
 Pomeranian (dog), a breed of dog
 Princeton Ocean Model, a model for ocean circulation
 Prescription-only medicine, a medicine that requires a prescription
 Particulate organic matter
 Posterior nucleus, of the thalamus; see Barrel cortex

Chemistry
 Pivaloyloxymethyl, a functional group in organic chemistry
 Polyoxometalate, a type of inorganic compound used as catalysts
 Polyoxymethylene, a common plastic polymer

Computing
 Parallax occlusion mapping, a computer graphics method to add 3D complexity to textures
 Pattern-oriented modeling, a technique to validate agent-based models
 Project Object Model, the central construct of the Apache Maven build management system
 Probabilistic Ontology Model, a method for ontology learning used in KAON

Other uses
 Pom (dish), a taro like root based oven dish native to Suriname
 Pom (slang), a slang term for a British person
 Pom language
 Production and Operations Management, a peer-reviewed academic journal
 Pom-pom or pom, a decorative ball
 Pom Klementieff (born 1986), French actress
 Patrouilleur Outre-mer, a type of high-sea patrol vessel

See also
 Pome, a type of fruit 
 Pomme (disambiguation)
 Phom (disambiguation)